Ekhymosis are a Colombian rock band formed by Juan Esteban "Juanes" Aristizábal Vásquez, along with friends Andrés García, Fernando "Toby" Tobón and José David Lopera from Medellín. The band was created in 1988 with heavy influences from Metallica and other important metal acts of the 80s, as well as some popular Latino music.

Career 
Even since their beginning as a metal band, Ekhymosis ('bruise') showed the same pro-Latino lyrics as Kraken. After some live performances to become known in their city (and more regions of Colombia), the band recorded a demo of two songs, which described the violence in Medellín and the injustice of innocent deaths and other problems in Colombia. The demo sold out (thanks to friends and family of the band), and they decided to record a second. This time Ekhymosis had luck: In the studio was a Codiscos representative; she heard and liked the demo and the band signed with that label.

1993 saw the release of Niño Gigante, a heavy metal album that included one of the band's most well known songs, "Solo". Controversy and the term "sell-out" surrounded the band with their next release: 1994's Ciudad Pacífico, produced by Federico López, a more hard rock-oriented record with more Latin sounds. Ekhymosis was looking for their unique sound; they didn't want to be the "Spanish Metallica". Rather, they wanted to create Colombian rock.

In the following year, 1995, the band with its two new members, released Amor Bilingüe, topping the Colombian charts with the single "De Madrugada". The video of the song had incredible replay value on MTV Latino. The same year, Ekhymosis recorded a rock version of the National Anthem of Colombia, which caused controversy among some, but was well received among Colombian youth. Ekhymosis was the chosen band to open for Bon Jovi in November of that year, but due to the murder of the politician Alvaro Gómez the band decided not to play in order to allow the concert to finish earlier.

The next year, the band released their unplugged album, titled Acústico, and Ekhymosis decided to go to Los Angeles where they played in local pubs and began recording their new album. In 1996, the band, now with four members (Juan Esteban, Andrés, Toby and José) recorded in L.A. their self-titled album, which saw the re-makes of three of their best songs ("Solo", "Sin Rencores", "De Madrugada") and new ones, the most remarkable being "La Tierra", known by some fans as "the second Colombian Anthem". The band was at its peak, but little knew the fans that those were the last days of one of the most important bands in Colombia.

In 1997, Ekhymosis won 3 Shock Awards (Best National Group, Best Song for "La Tierra", and Best Composer for Juan Esteban). Some months later, due to internal problems in deciding the future of the band, Ekhymosis disbanded. Juan Esteban, then, began his solo career as Juanes; the drummer of the band, Jose Lopera, worked with him on his first album, and has continued to work with Juanes to this day; the guitarist of Ekhymosis, Toby, started to play with Juanes on his second album and has continued with Juanes as well. Juanes has been known to perform Ekhymosis songs at his concerts, namely "Solo" and "La Tierra".

Reunion 

In 2012, the band announced a reunion with new members, in a rendition to their origins as a thrash metal band, and playing their early songs before 1992. This lineup also includes the only remaining member since its beginnings, bassist and former lead guitarist Andrés García.

Members

Current members 
 Andrés García – bass (1990–1999, 2012–present), lead guitar (1988–1989)
 Mauricio Estrada – drums (2012–present)
 Felipe Manrique – lead guitar (2015–present)
 Luis Duqueiro – vocals (2015–present)
 James Agudelo – rhythm guitar (2018–present)

Past members 
 Juan Esteban Aristizábal – vocals (1990–1997), rhythm guitar (1988–1997)
 Alex Oquendo – vocals (1988)
 Toto Lalinde – vocals (1989)
 Esteban Mora – drums (1988–1993)
 José Lopera – drums (1994–1997)
 Felipe Martínez – percussion (1994–1996)
 Felipe Zárate – bass (1988–1989)
 José Uribe – lead guitar (1990–1993)
 Fernando "Toby" Tobón – lead guitar (1994–1997)
 Alejandro Ochoa – keyboards (1992–1996)
 Oscar Osorio – rhythm guitar (2012–2013, 2015–2017)
 Diego Vargas – rhythm guitar (2013)

Featured members 
 Jorge Vargas – percussion
 Felipe Alzate – percussion
 Andrés Múnera – keyboards

Discography

Albums

References

External links 
Hechos en la vida de Juanes (Juanes Timeline as an artist)

Musical groups disestablished in 1997
Musical groups established in 1988
Rock en Español music groups
Colombian heavy metal musical groups
Colombian thrash metal musical groups
Musical quartets
Musical groups from Medellín
Musical groups reestablished in 2012